Lago di Pietra del Pertusillo is a lake in the Province of Potenza, Basilicata, Italy. At an elevation of 532 m, its catchment basin area is 630 km², while the lake itself has an area of 7.5 km².

Lakes of Basilicata